Dicranum spurium is a species of moss belonging to the family Dicranaceae.

It has almost cosmopolitan distribution.

References

Dicranales
Taxa named by Johann Hedwig
Plants described in 1801